Statistics of the Primera División de México for the 1971–72 season.

Overview

San Luis was promoted to Primera División.

This season was contested by 18 teams, and Cruz Azul won the championship.

Irapuato was relegated to Segunda División.

Teams

Group stage

Group 1

Group 2

Results

Relegation Playoffs

Bracket

Semifinals

Atlético Español won 4-3 on aggregate

Veracruz won 3-1 on aggregate

Final

Irapuato relegated to Segunda Division

Championship Playoffs

Bracket

Semifinal

Cruz Azul won 2-1 on aggregate

Aggregate tied. 3rd match will be played

America won 5-4 on aggregate

Final

References
Mexico - List of final tables (RSSSF)

Liga MX seasons
Mex
1